Bützow is a town in the district of Rostock in Mecklenburg-Vorpommern in north-eastern Germany, centered on Bützower See.

History
The town was first mentioned in 1171. From 1815 to 1918 Bützow was part of the Grand Duchy of Mecklenburg-Schwerin, from 1871 within the German Empire.

From 1933 to 1945, during Nazi rule and World War II, a Nazi prison was operated in the Dreibergen district with multiple forced labour subcamps located in various places in the region. After the war, the town was part of East Germany until 1990.

On 5 May 2015, the town was struck by an F3 tornado which caused severe damage to many buildings, including the local hospital.

Culture
Medieval Bützow Castle is located in Bützow. The town also has a medieval Brick Gothic church, which contains an altarpiece made by the Master of the Bützow Altarpiece (1503). Bützow also has one of the last German monuments dedicated to Lenin, a memorial stone located at Leninring.

Notable people
 Dietrich Ludwig Gustav Karsten (1768-1810), mineralogist
 Else Hirsch (1889-1943), Jewish teacher
 Eckhard Martens (born 1951), rower
 Torsten Fröhling (born 1966), soccer player and football coach
 Andrea Philipp (born 1971), athlete and Olympian

People who have worked in Bützow
 Sophie Charlotte of Hesse-Kassel (1678-1749), Duchess of Mecklenburg, lived in Bützow and founded here the German Reformed community
 Wenceslaus Johann Gustav Karsten (1732-1787), mathematician, twice rector of the University of Bützow

References 

Cities and towns in Mecklenburg
1230s establishments in the Holy Roman Empire
1236 establishments in Europe
Populated places established in the 13th century
Grand Duchy of Mecklenburg-Schwerin